Pietralata is a station on Line B of the Rome Metro. It is located on Via di Pietralata, after which it is named, in the Pietralata quarter, the 21st quarter of Rome, near the Forte Tiburtino and the Autostrada A24.

It opened on 8 December 1990. It was originally to have been known as Feronia, after the street of that name not far from where the station was to be sited, while the name of Pietralata was supposed to be assigned to the Quintiliani station. Just a few months before the station opened to the public, it was decided to give it the present name.

References

External links

http://www.atac.roma.it/index.asp?p=1&i=56&o=0&a=4&tpg=9&NUM=MBA&st=90046

Rome Metro Line B stations
Railway stations opened in 1990
1990 establishments in Italy
Railway stations in Italy opened in the 20th century